Cecilie Skog (born August 9, 1974) is a Norwegian adventurer, who finished the first solo crossing of Antartica in 2010.

Life
Skog studied and worked as a nurse, but since summiting Mount Everest in 2004, she has worked as a professional adventurer, guide and lecturer.

In August 2008, she climbed K2. Her husband, Rolf Bae, who had been climbing with her on K2, perished during the descent, as did ten other mountaineers.

In January 2010, she finished the first unassisted and unsupported crossing of Antarctica. Together with Ryan Waters, she took 70 days, from November 13, 2009 to January 21, 2010, to complete the more than 1800 km long journey across the Antarctic continent.

Summits
 Mont Blanc 4807 m, 1996
 Aconcagua, 6962 m (South America) 1999
 Denali, 6194 m (North America) 2001
 Cho Oyu 8188 m, 2003
 Elbrus, 5642 m (Europe) 2003
 Mount Everest, 8848 m (Asia) 2004
 Kilimanjaro, 5895 m (Africa) 2004
 Mount Vinson, 4897 m (Antarctica) 2006
 Mount Kosciuszko, 2228 m (Australia) 2006
 Carstensz Pyramid, 4884 m (Oceania), 2007
 K2, 8611 m (Asia) 2008, summited on August 1 with Lars Nessa. First Norwegians to summit K2.
 Manaslu 8163 m, 2011
 Lhotse 8516 m, 2012

Other adventures
2003: Shisha Pangma 8042 m (Reached 7400 m)
2004: Greenland, crossed the inland ice East to West - 610 km.
2005: K2 8611 m (Reached 7300 m)
2005: South Pole, skied from Ross Ice Shelf to the pole in 32 days.
2006: North Pole, skied from Ellsemere Island to the pole in 49 days.
2009: Greenland, crossed the inland ice West to East - 590 km.
2010: Crossed Antarctica, from Berkner Island via the South Pole to Ross Ice Shelf in 70 days and more than 1800 km.
2011: Interrupted ski attempt (dragging a canoe) to North Pole during summertime

Books 
Cecilie Skog og de tre polene (2006) 
Til Rolf (2009)
Antarktis (2011)
Utemat (2012)
Et friluftsliv (2014)

See also
Explorers Grand Slam
Three Poles Challenge

References

External links
Cecilie Skog on 7summits.com 
Dagbladet article (Norwegian)
First unassisted and unsupported crossing of Antarctica

1974 births
Living people
Norwegian mountain climbers
Female polar explorers
Summiters of the Seven Summits
People from Ålesund
Norwegian polar explorers